Problema byssus, the byssus skipper or bunchgrass skipper, is a butterfly of the family Hesperiidae. It is found along the Atlantic coastal plain of North America, from North Carolina south to Florida and the Gulf States and from northern Indiana west to Iowa and south to Missouri and Kansas.

The wingspan is 37–46 mm. The upperside is bright yellow orange with black borders and a black bar at the end of the cell. The underside of the hindwings is dull yellow in males and rusty or orange in females. Both sexes have a band of pale spots. Adults feed on the nectar of various flowers, including pickerelweed.

The larvae feed on Tripsacum dactyloides.

Subspecies
Problema byssus byssus
Problema byssus kumskaka (Scudder, 1887)

References

Butterflies described in 1880
Hesperiini
Butterflies of North America